"Something About the Way You Look Tonight" is a song by English musician Elton John, taken from his 25th studio album, The Big Picture. It was written by John and Bernie Taupin, and produced by Chris Thomas. It was released as the album's first single on 8 September 1997 by Mercury Records and the Rocket Record Company.

Five days after the song's solo release, it was issued as a double A-side single with "Candle in the Wind 1997". That single and its video were dedicated to the memory of Diana, Princess of Wales, who died that year, with proceeds from the sale of the single going towards Diana's charities. According to the Recording Industry Association of America, with certified sales, this double A-side is "the best-selling single of all time". The Guinness World Records 2009 states that the song is "the biggest-selling single since UK and US singles charts began in the 1950s, having accumulated worldwide sales of 33 million copies".

Music video
The video for the song was directed by Tim Royes and features Elton singing and playing piano to an empty theatre, as well as actors and actresses from the UK television programme This Life, as well as supermodels Kate Moss and Sophie Dahl appearing in a fashion show.  Many consider it as one of Elton John's best videos. John has publicly revealed (through his "warts and all" documentary Tantrums and Tiaras) that he finds videos "fucking loathsome" and after the videos from his album The Big Picture refrained from appearing in his own videos unless they were cameo appearances.

Sales and chart positions
In the UK alone, the double A-side single with "Candle in the Wind 1997" sold over 4,930,000 copies (8× Platinum), making the song the best-selling single ever in UK history. It remained for five weeks at the number-one position. In the US, the double A-side single spent 14 weeks at number one on the Billboard Hot 100. The best-selling single in Billboard history and the only single ever certified Diamond in the US, the single sold over 11 million copies in the US. 

On the US adult contemporary chart, however, "Something About the Way You Look Tonight" and "Candle in the Wind 1997" charted separately; while the tribute to Princess Diana peaked at number 2 on this chart, "Something About the Way You Look Tonight" spent 10 weeks at number 1 in late 1997 and early 1998. This double-sided single holds the record for the fewest weeks in a chart year from a year-end number-one single, with as few as eight. (In 1998, it had 34 more total weeks, however it was number 8 in the year-end list of 1998.) 

After this song, John was unable to reach the top spot of the US adult contemporary chart for 24 years until his collaboration with Ed Sheeran, titled "Merry Christmas" reached at number one for five weeks.

Critical reception
Billboard magazine said the song is a "grandly executed ballad that washes John's larger-than-life performance in cinematic strings and whooping, choir-styled backing vocals. An instant fave for die-hards, this single will bring kids at top 40 to the table after a few spins." Music & Media wrote that "this single proves that Elton John's composing and performing skills are as good as ever. A ballad, boasting a classy string arrangement by Anne Dudley of Art Of Noise fame, it's vaguely reminiscent of another John/Taupin composition, 1973's Candle In The Wind, but it's too original to be called a ripoff."

Personnel
 Elton John – piano, vocals
 Davey Johnstone – guitars
 John Jorgenson – guitars
 Bob Birch – bass guitar
 Guy Babylon – keyboards
 Charlie Morgan – drums and percussion
 Paul Carrack – organ
 Carol Kenyon – backing vocals
 Jackie Rawe – backing vocals
 Strings arranged by Guy Babylon and Anne Dudley
 Anne Dudley – conducting

Charts
The following chart entries are for "Something About the Way You Look Tonight" as a solo single.

Weekly charts

Year-end charts

Release history

See also
 List of best-selling singles in Australia

References

External links
 

 

Songs about nights
1990s ballads
1997 singles
1997 songs
Elton John songs
Mercury Records singles
Music videos directed by Tim Royes
Pop ballads
Song recordings produced by Chris Thomas (record producer)
Songs with lyrics by Bernie Taupin
Songs with music by Elton John
The Rocket Record Company singles